Colonel Frederick Paget (9 March 1807 – 4 January 1866) was a British soldier and Whig politician.

Background
Paget was the son of the Honourable Berkeley Paget, sixth son of Henry Paget, 1st Earl of Uxbridge. His mother was Sophia, daughter of the Hon. William Bucknall. He was the nephew of Henry Paget, 1st Marquess of Anglesey, Sir Arthur Paget, Sir Edward Paget and Sir Charles Paget.

Military and political career
Paget served in the Coldstream Guards and achieved the rank of captain. In 1832 he was returned to parliament for Beaumaris, a seat he held until 1847 when he was succeeded by his cousin Lord George Paget.

Family
Paget married Maria Georgiana, daughter of Charles Grenfell, in 1856. He died in January 1866, aged 58. His wife survived him by over 30 years and died in September 1900.

References

External links 
 

1807 births
1866 deaths
Coldstream Guards officers
Whig (British political party) MPs for Welsh constituencies
UK MPs 1832–1835
UK MPs 1835–1837
UK MPs 1837–1841
UK MPs 1841–1847
Frederick
Members of the Parliament of the United Kingdom for Beaumaris